Virginie Vandamme (born October 19, 1966 in Arras, Pas-de-Calais) is a French sprint canoer who competed in the late 1980s. She was eliminated in the semifinals of the K-4 500 m event at the 1988 Summer Olympics in Seoul.

References
 Sports-reference.com profile

1966 births
Living people
Sportspeople from Arras
Canoeists at the 1988 Summer Olympics
French female canoeists
Olympic canoeists of France